Belarus–Malaysia relations refers to the bilateral relations between Belarus and Malaysia. Neither country has a resident ambassador. Belarus embassy in Jakarta is accredited to Malaysia. Both countries are members of the Non-Aligned Movement.

History 
Relations between the two countries has been established since 5 March 1992 with the relations are mainly focused in economic co-operation. In February 2003, the Belarusian Minister of Foreign Affairs Mikhail Khvostov took part in the 13th Summit of the Non-Aligned Movement (NAM) in Kuala Lumpur, Malaysia.

Economic relations 
Major exports from Belarus are such as potash and nitrogen fertilisers, while the main imports from Malaysia are rubber, lamps and tubes, cocoa, TV sets, video monitors, video projectors and radios. Currently, Belarus are keen to expand trade and investment ties, and the country also seek to increase export of potash fertilisers and tires to Malaysia. In 2013, a Belarus National Exposition has been launched in Malaysia to features high-tech and innovative products from Belarus. The Belarusian region of Minsk Oblast has announced its intention to develop co-operation with the Malaysian state of Sabah, with the Belarusian side said that the relations in all spheres between the two countries should develop more actively, including between regions.

Security relations 
Malaysia is also seeking military co-operation with Belarus to repair its military aircraft.

References 

 
Malaysia
Bilateral relations of Malaysia